Tom Cutler (born 8 November 1995) is a professional Australian rules footballer playing for the Essendon Football Club in the Australian Football League (AFL). He previously played for the Brisbane Lions between 2014 and 2019.

Early life
Cutler grew up in Balwyn, in the eastern suburbs of Melbourne, supporting the Brisbane Lions as a child. At the age of 16, he stopped playing club footy to concentrate on school football for Trinity Grammar, and to play basketball, at which he also excelled.

Cutler had an injury ridden 2013 with the Oakleigh Chargers, although when he was available he impressed recruiters with his elite decision-making and athleticism.

AFL career
Cutler debuted in Round 4 of the 2014 AFL season against Port Adelaide at the Adelaide Oval. He went on to play 7 games for the year, including a 21 disposal effort against Richmond at the Gabba in Round 5. His first season was cut short due to injury, suffering from a groin injury and then having minor knee surgery.

Statistics
Statistics are correct to the end of Finals Week 1 2021 

|- style="background-color: #EAEAEA"
! scope="row" style="text-align:center" | 2014
|  || 26 || 7 || 2 || 0 || 55 || 27 || 82 || 24 || 6 || 0.3 || 0.0 || 7.9 || 3.9 || 11.7 || 3.4 || 0.9
|- 
! scope="row" style="text-align:center" | 2015
|  || 26 || 11 || 1 || 2 || 106 || 73 || 179 || 38 || 14 || 0.1 || 0.2 || 9.6 || 6.6 || 16.3 || 3.5 || 1.3
|- style="background-color: #EAEAEA"
! scope="row" style="text-align:center" | 2016
|  || 26 || 15 || 9 || 6 || 176 || 101 || 277 || 53 || 35 || 0.6 || 0.4 || 11.7 || 6.7 || 18.5 || 3.5 || 2.3
|- 
! scope="row" style="text-align:center" | 2017
|  || 26 || 12 || 8 || 6 || 148 || 83 || 231 || 66 || 16 || 0.7 || 0.5 || 12.3 || 6.9 || 19.3 || 5.5 || 1.3
|- style="background-color: #EAEAEA"
! scope="row" style="text-align:center" | 2018
|  || 26 || 18 || 11 || 15 || 251 || 117 || 368 || 117 || 35 || 0.6 || 0.8 || 13.9 || 6.5 || 20.4 || 6.5 || 1.9
|-
! scope="row" style="text-align:center" | 2019
|  || 26 || 3 || 1 || 2 || 40 || 25 || 65 || 15 || 6 || 0.3 || 0.7 || 13.3 || 8.3 || 21.7 || 5.0 || 2.0
|- style="background-color: #EAEAEA"
! scope="row" style="text-align:center" | 2020
|  || 12 || 8 || 2 || 5 || 66 || 44 || 110 || 25 || 10 || 0.3 || 0.6 || 8.3 || 5.5 || 13.6 || 3.1 || 1.3
|- style="background-color: #EAEAEA"
! scope="row" style="text-align:center" | 2021
|  || 12 || 13 || 1 || 4 || 113 || 65 || 178 || 51 || 16 || 0.0 || 0.3 || 8.6 || 5.0 || 13.6 || 3.9 || 1.2
|-
|- class="sortbottom"
! colspan=3| Career
! 87
! 35
! 40
! 955 
! 535 
! 1490 
! 389
! 138 
! 0.4
! 0.4
! 10.9
! 6.1 
! 17.1
! 4.4
! 1.5
|}

References

External links

1995 births
Living people
Brisbane Lions players
Oakleigh Chargers players
Australian rules footballers from Melbourne
People educated at Trinity Grammar School, Kew
Essendon Football Club players
People from Balwyn, Victoria